Minuscule 343 (in the Gregory-Aland numbering), ε 120 (Soden), is a Greek minuscule manuscript of the New Testament, on parchment. Palaeographically it has been assigned to the 11th century. 
It has full marginalia.

Description 

The codex contains a complete text of the four Gospels on 283 parchment leaves. The text is written in one column per page, in 21 lines per page.

There is also a division according to the Ammonian Sections (in Mark 242 Sections, the last in 16:20), whose numbers are given at the margin, with references to the Eusebian Canons (written below Ammonian Section numbers).

Lectionary markings at the margin (for liturgical reading) were added by later hand.

Text 

The Greek text of the codex is a representative of the Byzantine text-type. Hermann von Soden classified it to the textual family Kx. Aland placed it in Category V.
According to the Claremont Profile Method it creates the textual cluster 343 in Luke 1 and Luke 10. In Luke 20 it has a mixture of the Byzantine text-families.

History 

The manuscript was written by Presbyter Antony, a monk, on September 1. According to the colophon: 

It was partly examined by Scholz (Matthew and John). Burgon saw this manuscript. It was added to the list of New Testament manuscripts by Scholz (1794-1852).
C. R. Gregory saw it in 1886.

The manuscript is currently housed at the Biblioteca Ambrosiana (H. 13 sup.) in Milan.

See also 

 List of New Testament minuscules
 Biblical manuscript
 Textual criticism

References

Further reading 

 J. M. A. Scholz, Biblisch-kritische Reise (Leipzig, 1822), p. 70-73.

Greek New Testament minuscules
11th-century biblical manuscripts